Ukridge is a collection of short stories by P.G. Wodehouse, first published in the United Kingdom on 3 June 1924 by Herbert Jenkins, London, and in the United States on 30 July 1925 by George H. Doran, New York, under the title He Rather Enjoyed It.

The stories had previously appeared in Cosmopolitan Magazine in the US and in the Strand Magazine in the UK.

The book contains ten short stories relating the adventures of Stanley Featherstonehaugh Ukridge, narrated by Ukridge's long-suffering friend, the writer "Corky" Corcoran.

Contents 
 "Ukridge's Dog College"
 United States: Cosmopolitan, April 1923
 United Kingdom: Strand, May 1923
 "Ukridge's Accident Syndicate"
 US: Cosmopolitan, May 1923
 UK: Strand, June 1923 (as "Ukridge, Teddy Weeks and the Tomato")
 "The Debut of Battling Billson" (spelled Début in original versions)
 US: Cosmopolitan, June 1923
 UK: Strand, July 1923
 "First Aid for Dora"
 US: Cosmopolitan, July 1923
 UK: Strand, August 1923
 "The Return of Battling Billson"
 US: Cosmopolitan, August 1923
 UK: Strand, September 1923
 "Ukridge Sees Her Through"
 US: Cosmopolitan, September 1923
 UK: Strand, October 1923
 "No Wedding Bells for Him"
 US: Cosmopolitan, October 1923
 UK: Strand, November 1923
 "The Long Arm of Looney Coote"
 US: Cosmopolitan, November 1923
 UK: Strand, December 1923
 "The Exit of Battling Billson"
 US: Cosmopolitan, December 1923
 UK: Strand, January 1924
 "Ukridge Rounds a Nasty Corner"
 US: Cosmopolitan, January 1924
 UK: Strand, February 1924

Ukridge had previously appeared in Love Among the Chickens (1906), Wodehouse's first novel to be published in the US, and would return in some other shorts. The timeline of his adventures is rather hard to follow—the tales collected here begin with him meeting up with Corky after a long separation, and follow fairly neatly on from each other, via being disowned by his Aunt Julia to meeting Millie, to whom he is married by the time of Love Among the Chickens. In the later shorts, however, he seems to be still single and living sporadically with his aunt.

See also 
 List of Wodehouse's Ukridge stories

References and sources
References

Sources

External links 
 
  
 
The Russian Wodehouse Society's page, with photos of book covers and a list of characters
Fantastic Fiction's page, with details of published editions, photos of book covers and links to used copies

Short story collections by P. G. Wodehouse
1924 short story collections
Herbert Jenkins books